Eleocharis spiralis is a sedge of the family Cyperaceae that is native to Australia.

It blooms between February and April producing white flowers.

It is found in and around brackish areas such as lagoons and estuaries in coastal parts of the Kimberley region of Western Australia.

References

Plants described in 1824
Flora of Western Australia
spiralis